Southpointe is a  suburban business park located in Cecil Township near Canonsburg, Pennsylvania, south of Pittsburgh and is a familiar landmark along Interstate 79.  It is home to many corporations, including Fortune 500 members CONSOL Energy and Viatris as well as Ansys.

Since the development of the Marcellus Shale in the Appalachian region, Southpointe has also become home to many natural gas producers, including Range Resources, Noble Energy, EQT and other service companies related to the industry.

Southpointe is also home to the PrintScape Arena at Southpointe, which was the main practice and training facility for the Pittsburgh Penguins from May 20, 1995 until 2015. Since 2010 its golf course has hosted the PGA Tour event Mylan Classic.

Planning for what would become Southpointe began in the 1980s, as the Washington County Redevelopment Authority in partnership with the RIDC began to pursue a tract of land in Cecil Township that had been the site of the Western Center, a reform school and a state mental hospital. The property for the first phase, Southpointe I, was acquired in 1986, with construction beginning in 1993. The location was chosen because of its access to Interstate 79, its proximity to Pittsburgh and low tax rates. A third phase is planned for the other side of Interstate 79, to be called Cool Valley Industrial Park.

It was developed by Millcraft Industries

References

External links
Southpointe Marcellus Shale Directory and Quarterly Report
Southpointe Marcellus Shale Chamber of Commerce
Post-Gazette article on Southpointe
Southpointe I page at Washington County
Southpointe II page at Washington County

Buildings and structures in Washington County, Pennsylvania